Sean Lampley (born September 3, 1979) is an American former professional basketball player.

College career
Lampley played at the University of California, leading the Golden Bears to victory over Clemson in the 1999 National Invitational Tournament and earning MVP honors.  In 2001, he led the team to the NCAA Tournament, but the Bears lost in the first round to Fresno State. Lampley ended his career as the only player in school history to rank in the top 10 in points (1,776, 1st), rebounds (889, 4th) and assists (295, 10th).  He was named Pac-10 Player of the Year and Honorable Mention All-America his senior year by the AP.

Lampley's career scoring record stood until he was surpassed by point guard Jerome Randle on March 13, 2010, with 1,790 career points.

Professional career
Lampley was selected by the Chicago Bulls in the 2nd round (44th pick) of the 2001 NBA Draft. He began his career with the Saskatchewan Hawks of the Continental Basketball Association (CBA) and earned All-Rookie Team honors in 2002. Although he never wore a Bulls uniform, Lampley played 35 games for the Miami Heat during the 2002–03 season and 10 games for the Golden State Warriors during the 2003–04 season. He competed with the Sacramento Kings in 2006 summer league play.

Lampley only played a total of 45 games in his NBA career with career averages of 4.5 points and 2.1 rebounds. His final NBA game was played on December 12, 2003, in a 85 - 96 loss to the New Orleans Hornets where he recorded 9 points and 2 rebounds.

Oceania career

Lampley signed with the Melbourne Tigers of Australia's National Basketball League in December 2007. After arriving in the country only 2 days prior, Lampley made his debut in the NBL's biggest attendance of the season, scoring 10 points (on 3/5 shooting) and pulling down 4 rebounds in the Tigers' victory over the South Dragons at Melbourne Arena on December 15.  He played with the Oaks Card Club squad in 2006–2007. His signing filled the void left by recently de-listed player Martin Muursepp, who suffered from poor form partly due to an ongoing battle with an ankle injury. Lampley sunk a 3 as time expired to get the Tigers ahead 2–1 against the Sydney kings in the 2007-2008 finals.

References

External links
HoopsHype.com profile
NBA player profile
Lampley shoots for the Tigers
Asia-basket.com profile

1979 births
Living people
American expatriate basketball people in Australia
American expatriate basketball people in Canada
American expatriate basketball people in Germany
American expatriate basketball people in Greece
American expatriate basketball people in Japan
American expatriate basketball people in the Philippines
American expatriate basketball people in Qatar
American expatriate basketball people in Spain
American men's basketball players
Artland Dragons players
Barako Bull Energy Boosters players
Barangay Ginebra San Miguel players
Basketball players from Chicago
California Golden Bears men's basketball players
CB Axarquía players
Chicago Bulls draft picks
Dakota Wizards (CBA) players
Golden State Warriors players
Makedonikos B.C. players
Melbourne Tigers players
Miami Heat players
People from Harvey, Illinois
Philippine Basketball Association imports
Small forwards
Sportspeople from Cook County, Illinois